Gulph Mills is an unincorporated community in Upper Merion Township, Montgomery County, Pennsylvania. It is served by the Upper Merion Area School District. There is a station on the Norristown High Speed Line.

A grist mill built here in 1747 supplied flour to the Continental Army during their stay at Valley Forge. General George Washington's army encamped in the area for a week before departing for winter quarters at Valley Forge. Washington used the area as an ammunition depot during the autumn of 1777. The encampment is marked by a memorial erected by the Sons of the American Revolution in 1893.

Another attraction here is the Hanging Rock, a major attraction on Pennsylvania Route 320. Hanging Rock reportedly holds importance as a place by which George Washington led his troops. PennDOT has looked to remove Hanging Rock, but preservationists have battled such action since the 1970s.

The Bridge in Upper Merion Township and Hanging Rock are listed on the National Register of Historic Places.

References

Philadelphia Main Line
Unincorporated communities in Montgomery County, Pennsylvania
Unincorporated communities in Pennsylvania
Upper Merion Township, Montgomery County, Pennsylvania